ZZZZ or zzzz may refer to:

 Zzzz, a cross-linguistic onomatopoeia for snoring
 A series of Zs in a speech balloon, a comic book convention for snoring 
ZZZZ, the four-letter placeholder ICAO airport code
Zzzz, the ISO 15924 code for uncoded script
ZZZZ, a mid-2000s rock band including former members of the band Sweep the Leg Johnny
"Zzzz", a silent track on the 2014 album Sleepify by Vulfpe kind

Five or more Zs
"ZZZZZ", a 1964 episode of The Outer Limits
Zzzzzz, a joke line based in Los Angeles

See also
 Z (disambiguation)
 ZZ (disambiguation)
 Zzz (disambiguation)
 ZZZZ Best, a fraudulent business created by Barry Minkow